Herbert Anderson (March 30, 1917 – June 11, 1994) was an American character actor from Oakland, California, probably best remembered for his role as Henry Mitchell, the father, on the CBS television sitcom Dennis the Menace.

Background
Anderson attended Oakland High School and later the University of California, Berkeley. He was the son of Herbert Julius Anderson and Gertrude M. (Nelson) Anderson. His father, the son of Norwegian immigrants, served as Oakland's city treasurer during the 1920s.

Career
After a few minor roles in films for Warner Bros., Anderson got his big break in Navy Blues (1941 film), starring Martha Raye and Ann Sheridan, followed by The Body Disappears and The Male Animal in which he co-starred with Henry Fonda and Olivia de Havilland. His other films include the 1949 World War II film Battleground, Give My Regards to Broadway, Excuse My Dust, Island in the Sky, The Benny Goodman Story, Kelly and Me, Joe Butterfly, My Man Godfrey (1957), I Bury the Living, Sunrise at Campobello, Hold On! and Rascal.
Anderson also acted extensively in Broadway shows, including the role of Dr. Bird in The Caine Mutiny Court-Martial. He was also in the film version of The Caine Mutiny, with Humphrey Bogart; he was the only actor to appear in both the Broadway play and film.

In addition to his role on Dennis the Menace, Anderson is also known for many lead and guest-starring roles on television, including: Crossroads, The Many Loves of Dobie Gillis, The Real McCoys, Perry Mason, The David Niven Show, Mr. Adams and Eve, Sea Hunt, Alfred Hitchcock Presents, My Three Sons, The Bing Crosby Show, I Dream of Jeannie, The Smothers Brothers Show, The Cara Williams Show, Petticoat Junction,Bewitched, Daniel Boone, Family Affair, Adam-12, Green Acres, Batman , Dragnet, The bank jobs, The Brady Bunch, The Name of the Game, The Governor and J.J., Ironside, Gunsmoke (“Trip West” in 1964), Nanny and the Professor, The Jimmy Stewart Show, The Smith Family, The Rookies, Rawhide, The Man from U.N.C.L.E. and The Waltons. 

Anderson retired from acting in 1982 after undergoing heart surgery. He died of complications from a stroke on June 11, 1994, in Palm Springs, California.

Partial filmography

 The Fighting 69th (1940) - Pvt. Casey (uncredited)
 Calling Philo Vance (1940) - First Reporter (uncredited)
 Dr. Ehrlich's Magic Bullet (1940) - Medical Assistant (uncredited)
 'Til We Meet Again (1940) - (uncredited)
 Tear Gas Squad (1940) - Pliny Jones
 The Man Who Talked Too Much (1940) - Hotel Clerk #2 (uncredited)
 The Sea Hawk (1940) - Eph Winters (uncredited)
 Service with the Colors (1940, Short) - Hiram Briggs
 No Time for Comedy (1940) - Actor in Show (uncredited)
 Four Mothers (1941) - Reporter (uncredited)
 Honeymoon for Three (1941) - Floyd T. Ingram (Credits) / Floyd Y. Ingram
 The Strawberry Blonde (1941) - Girl-Chaser in Park (uncredited)
 Knockout (1941) - Reporter (uncredited)
 The Bride Came C.O.D. (1941) - 3rd Reporter
 Three Sons o' Guns (1941) - Michael (scenes deleted)
 Highway West (1941) - Worker (uncredited)
 Dive Bomber (1941) - Chubby
 Navy Blues (1941) - Homer Matthews
 The Body Disappears (1941) - George Appleby
 The Male Animal (1942) - Michael Barnes
 This Is the Army (1943) - Danny Davidson
 That Way with Women (1947) - Melvyn Pfeiffer
 Love and Learn (1947) - Pete
 My Wild Irish Rose (1947) - Reporter (uncredited)
 You Were Meant for Me (1948) - Eddie
 Give My Regards to Broadway (1948) - Frank Doty
 The Set-Up (1949) - Husband (uncredited)
 Battleground (1949) - Hansan
 The Yellow Cab Man (1950) - Willis Tomlin
 The Lawless (1950) - Jonas Creel
 The Skipper Surprised His Wife (1950) - Lt. Comdr. Kingslee (uncredited)
 The Magnificent Yankee (1950) - Baxter, Secretary
 The Prowler (1951) - Reporter (uncredited)
 Excuse My Dust (1951) - Ben Parrott
 Finders Keepers (1952) - Hotel Clerk
 The Girl in White (1952) - Dr. Barclay
 Island in the Sky (1953) - Breezy
 The Caine Mutiny (1954) - Ens. Rabbit (uncredited)
 The Benny Goodman Story (1956) - John Hammond Jr.
 Four Girls in Town (1957) - Ted Larabee
 Spring Reunion (1957) - Edward
 Kelly and Me (1957) - Ben Collins
 Joe Butterfly (1957) - Major Ferguson
 Night Passage (1957) - Will Renner
 My Man Godfrey (1957) - Hubert
 Official Detective (1958, Episode: "Muggers") - Mr. Melton
 I Bury the Living (1958) - Jess Jessup
 Sunrise at Campobello (1960) - Daly
 Gunsmoke (1964, Episode: "Trip West") - Elwood
 Hold On! (1966) - Ed Lindquist
 Rascal 
 Dragnet S10:E4. DR.Philip Lang (1968)

(1969) - Mr. Pringle

References

Bibliography

External links

1917 births
1994 deaths
American male television actors
American male film actors
American male stage actors
Male actors from Oakland, California
20th-century American male actors
American people of Norwegian descent